Christian Harley Cooper (born July 14, 1976) is a derivatives trader and author living in New York City. He is a frequent commentator in The Wall Street Journal, Reuters, Financial Times, and Bloomberg News. His writing has appeared in The Diplomat, The Hill, Foreign Affairs, and Nautilus Magazine.

Cooper is a member of the roundtables at the Washington-based think tank Center for Strategic and International Studies which is currently led by John Hamre.

Cooper directs Banking for a New Beginning, a public/private partnership between the Aspen Institute and the US Department of State. Banking for A New Beginning focuses on work with the central banks of Partners for a New Beginning (PNB) target countries including Turkey, Tunisia, Libya, Algeria, Pakistan, Morocco, Egypt and the Palestinian Territories, in an effort to share best practices, operational assistance, and coordinated action among the central banks.

Cannabis Trading & Patent
Cooper has filed a patent on the state-based central pricing and trading of cannabis in the U.S. In a May 2021 West Virginia gazette opinion piece, he argued the current U.S. political reality would prevent Federal legalization of cannabis and conservative states previously opposed to cannabis should legalize and regulate through a central market. He also argued the real value of the West Virginia market was 200 million dollars annually, not the $45 million often cited.

Quantitative Publishing
In 2016, John Wiley & Sons announced a partnership with Cooper to create a program for candidates taking the Financial Risk Manager exam. The program is built on the existing Wiley Efficient Learning platform and Cooper's Financial Risk Manager product. The partnership was built on the view that the FRM designation would rapidly grow to be one of the premier financial designations for Chartered Financial Analysts. In 2018, Wiley released the full series of Cooper's work on quantitative finance published in six volumes.

Banking for a New Beginning
Banking for a New Beginning is an initiative that aims to connect central banks in PNB target countries with similar financial institutions in the United States and Europe, in an effort to bridge communication and provide training and operational assistance where requested. The project will work specifically to facilitate information-sharing and best practices when it comes to supporting small and medium-sized enterprises, developing sustainable and secure energy, advancing entrepreneurship, and supporting local infrastructure development. By working closely with the central banking authorities, local businesses, and American and European counterparts, Banking for a New Beginning will facilitate coordinated banking practices as a means of cultivating globally business-friendly environments.

Detainment by Iranian Intelligence
While living in Iran, Cooper was briefly detained and interrogated by the IRGC. In October 2017, he published an essay titled "A Miscommunication and a Missing Peugeot" about the experience and outlined a way forward between the United States and Iran.

Early life
Cooper grew up in Rockwood, Tennessee.  His primary education was at a single room school at the local church. He credits luck and caring teachers for his subsequent escape from poverty. In January 2019, the app Pocket added Cooper’s essay “Why Poverty is Like a Disease”, based in part on Rockwood, to its must-read section reserved for the “most-saved, read, and shared stories on Pocket.”

Bibliography

Essays

Films
7 Splinters in Time (2018), Christian Cooper (Executive Producer), Gabriel Judet-Weinshel (Filmmaker/Director), Winner of the Cinequest Film Festival New Visions Award

2019 Quantitative Finance Book Series

Affiliations
 Former Term Member, Council on Foreign Relations
 Member, CSIS Roundtable
 Member, Aspen Institute Society of Fellows
 Fellow, Truman National Security Project
 Member, Chatham House

See also 
 Truman National Security Project
 Council On Foreign Relations
 Ahmad Zia Massoud

References

External links
Aspen Institute Society of Fellows

1976 births
Living people
Place of birth missing (living people)
Film producers from Tennessee
American financial analysts
Chatham House people
People from Rockwood, Tennessee